Just Like Home is a 2007 drama film directed by Lone Scherfig. It stars Lars Kaalund and Bodil Jørgensen.

Cast
Lars Kaalund as Apoteker
Bodil Jørgensen as Myrtle
Ann Eleonora Jørgensen as Margrethe
Peter Gantzler as Erling
Peter Hesse Overgaard as Lindy Steen

Storyline 
As the citizens of a secluded Danish town gradually lose their trust in one another, the sight of a naked man in the early morning hours sets off an unsettling wave of paranoia. Now, as a dedicated group of inhabitants set out to uncover the naked man's identity and re-establish their sense of community, they suddenly begin to realize that in assisting their neighbors they are simultaneously and inadvertently bettering themselves as well.

References

External links
 

2007 films
Danish drama films
Films directed by Lone Scherfig
2000s Danish-language films
2007 drama films